Gábor Fodor may refer to:

 Gábor Fodor (chemist) (1915–2000), Hungarian chemist
 Gábor Fodor (politician) (born 1962), Hungarian liberal politician